The New York Skyliners were a soccer team based in the Bronx borough of New York City. The club were a charter member of the United Soccer Association (USA) in 1967 and played their home games as Yankee Stadium.

History 
In 1966 several groups of entrepreneurs were exploring the idea of forming a professional soccer league in United States. One of these groups, United Soccer Association (USA) led by Jack Kent Cooke, selected 12 cities for team locations and the Irving Mitchell Felt purchased a franchise as part of the Madison Square Garden Corporation.  The USA originally planned to start play in the spring of 1968; however the rival National Professional Soccer League, which secured a TV contract from CBS, announced it was ready to launch in 1967. Not wanting to let the rival league gain an advantage, the USA decided to launch early. Not having secured any player contracts, the league imported teams from Europe, Brazil, and Uruguay to represent the franchise cities.  Uruguayan team C.A. Cerro was brought in to play as the Skyliners.

The Skyliners opened the season at home against the Toronto City in a 1 - 1 draw in front of crowd of 21,871.  The New York Skyliners finished the season fifth place with a record of 2 wins, 6 ties and 4 losses while drawing an average home league attendance of 8,766.

Following the 1967 season the United Soccer Association and the National Professional Soccer League merged to form the North American Soccer League.  It was announced that New York would be one of the 20-teams in play in the North American Soccer League (NASL). The merged league decided not to have two-team cities and both the owners of the NPSL's New York Generals and Skyliners stepped aside and the franchise right were awarded to Peter Elser, who had held a minority interest Generals. Elser's franchise retained the New York Generals' name and front office and the New York Skyliners effectively went out of existence.

Colors and badge 

While the New York Skyliners' home kits were all white, their away jerseys were the same blue and white stripes as C.A. Cerro's home kits.

Stadium 

The New York Skyliners played their home matches at Yankee Stadium.

Notes

Coach
  Ondino Viera

Year-by-year

Records 

 League victory: 4-1 v Dallas Tornado, June 27, 1967
 League defeat: 0-2 v Washington Whips, June 7, 1967

References

External links
 http://www.nyskyliners.net
 NY Skyliners roster

C.A. Cerro
Defunct soccer clubs in New York City
Skyliners
United Soccer Association franchises
1966 establishments in New York City
1968 disestablishments in New York (state)
Association football clubs established in 1966
Association football clubs disestablished in 1968
Sports in the Bronx